This is the list of cathedrals in Chile sorted by denomination.

Roman Catholic 
Cathedrals of the Roman Catholic Church in Chile:
 Cathedral of St. Joseph in Antofagasta
 Cathedral of St. Mark in Arica
 St. John the Baptist Cathedral, Calama
 Cathedral of Our Lady of Sorrows in Coyhaique
 Cathedral of St. Charles Borromeo in Chillán
 Cathedral of the Immaculate Conception in Concepción
 Cathedral of Our Lady of the Rosary in Copiapó
 Cathedral of St. Raphael in Illapel
 Cathedral of the Immaculate Conception in Iquique
 Cathedral of Our Lady of Mercy in La Serena
 Cathedral of St. Ambrose in Linares
 Cathedral of St. Joseph in Melipilla
 Military Cathedral of Our Lady of Mount Carmel in Santiago
 Cathedral of St. Matthew in Osorno
 Cathedral of Our Lady of Mount Carmel in Puerto Montt
 Cathedral of the Sacred Heart in Punta Arenas
 Catedral El Sagrario in Rancagua
 Cathedral of St. Bernard in San Bernardo
 Cathedral of Our Lady of the Rosary in Ancud
 Cathedral of St. Philip in San Felipe
 Cathedral of St. John the Baptist in Calama
 Cathedral of St. Mary of the Angels in Los Ángeles
 Cathedral of St. James in Santiago
 Cathedral of St. Augustine in Talca
 Cathedral of St. Joseph in Temuco
 Cathedral of Our Lady of the Rosary in Valdivia
 Cathedral of St. James in Valparaíso
 Cathedral of the Sacred Heart in Villarrica

Eastern Orthodox
Cathedrals of the Greek Orthodox Church of Antioch:
 St. George Cathedral in Santiago

See also
List of cathedrals

References

 
Chile
Cathedrals
Cathedrals